The Mackintosh Power Station is a conventional hydroelectric power station located in Western Tasmania, Australia.

Technical details
Part of the Pieman River scheme that comprises four hydroelectric power stations, the Mackintosh Power Station is the second station in the scheme. The power station is located aboveground at the foot of the rock-filled concrete faced Mackintosh Dam across the Mackintosh River and the Tullabardine Dam across the Tullabardine Creek that together form Lake Mackintosh. Water from the lake is fed to the power station by a -long single tunnel.

The station output, estimated to be  annually, is fed to TasNetworks' transmission grid via a 13.8 kV/220 kV Fuji generator transformer to the outdoor switchyard.

The water discharged from Mackintosh Power Station flows into Lake Rosebery for use in the Bastyan Power Station.

See also

 List of power stations in Tasmania

References

Further reading

Energy infrastructure completed in 1987
Hydroelectric power stations in Tasmania
Pieman River Power Development